Geophis downsi, also known as the Savage's earth snake, is a snake of the colubrid family. It is endemic to Costa Rica and only known from its type locality, Las Cruces Biological Station in the Puntarenas Province. It is named after Floyd Leslie Downs.

Only one specimen collected from under leaf litter in premontane rainforest is known. No further specimens were found during a study on leaf-litter fauna of the area in 2010–2012. There are no known threats to this species that was found in a private reserve.

References

Geophis
Snakes of North America
Reptiles of Costa Rica
Endemic fauna of Costa Rica
Reptiles described in 1981
Taxa named by Jay M. Savage